The Interpreter is a 2005 political thriller film directed by Sydney Pollack, starring Nicole Kidman, Sean Penn, Catherine Keener, and Jesper Christensen. It was the first film shot inside the United Nations Headquarters, as well as the final feature film directed by Pollack before his death in 2008.

An international co-production between the United States, United Kingdom, and France, the film was released in all three countries in April 2005. It received mixed reviews from critics and grossed $162 million against its $80 million budget.

Plot

In the Southern African country of Matobo, rebel leader Ajene Xola drives two men, Simon Broome and Philippe, to the abandoned Centennial Football Stadium. They discuss how President Edmond Zuwanie's regime has ruthlessly exterminated most of the population, and intimidated the survivors into silence. Upon their arrival at the stadium, they discover that the informants are schoolboys, who point Ajene and Simon in the direction of corpses left by Zuwanie's security apparatus, while Philippe stays in the car.

Shouting lures Ajene and Simon back to the field, where they are promptly executed by the boys, who are revealed to be willing accomplices of Zuwanie's secret police. Upon hearing the gunshots, Philippe clambers out of the car and hides, taking pictures of a car arriving carrying Matoban officials, and then escapes the vicinity.

Meanwhile, Simon's sister Silvia Broome is working as an interpreter for the United Nations in New York City. A white African born in the United States to a British mother and white Matoban father, she spent most of her life in Matobo, and is a dual citizen of both Matobo and the United States. Her diverse background leads to UN Security Chief Lee Wu wryly describing her as "being the UN".

The UN is considering indicting Zuwanie, to stand trial in the International Criminal Court. Initially a liberator, over the past 20 years he has become as corrupt and tyrannical as the government he overthrew, and is now responsible for ethnic cleansing and other atrocities within Matobo. Zuwanie is soon to visit the UN and put forward his own case to the General Assembly, in an attempt to avoid the indictment.

A security scare caused by a malfunctioning metal detector forces the evacuation of the UN building, and, as Silvia returns at night to reclaim some personal belongings, she overhears two men discussing an assassination plot in Ku (the Matoban lingua franca). Silvia runs from the building when the men become aware of her presence. The next day, Silvia recognizes words in a meeting, where she is interpreting, from phrases she overheard the night before, and reports the incident to UN security; the plot's target appears to be Zuwanie himself.

They, in turn, call in the US Secret Service, which assigns Dignitary Protection Division agents Tobin Keller and Dot Woods to investigate, as well as protect Zuwanie when he arrives, as well as Zuwanie's personal head of security, former Dutch mercenary Nils Lud. Keller, whose estranged wife was killed in a car accident just weeks earlier, learns that Silvia has, in the past, been involved in a Matoban guerrilla group, that her parents and sister were killed by landmines laid by Zuwanie's men, and that she has dated one of Zuwanie's political opponents. Although Keller is suspicious of Silvia's backstory, the two grow close, in part because of their shared grief, and Keller ends up protecting her from attacks on her person.

Philippe calls Silvia to meet and informs her of Xola's death, but, unable to bear her grief, lies and says he doesn't know what happened to Simon. Silvia attempts to obtain information by way of Kuman-Kuman, an exiled Matoban minister living in New York, only to almost be killed in a bus bombing perpetrated by Gabonese national Jean Gamba, Nils Lud's right-hand man, and part of the opening scene's coterie.

Philippe is later found dead in his hotel room, and Silvia finds out that her brother was killed along with Ajene Xola. She narrowly avoids an assassination attempt by Gamba (whom Keller kills) and leaves a voicemail on Keller's phone saying she's going back home. Keller takes this to mean she's returning to Matobo, and dispatches an agent to intercept her at John F. Kennedy International Airport.

The purported assassin is discovered and shot to death while Zuwanie is in the middle of his address to the General Assembly, and security personnel rush Zuwanie to a safe room for his protection. Silvia, anticipating this, has been hiding in the safe room, and confronts Zuwanie and intends to kill him herself. Keller determines that the assassination plot is a false flag operation created by Zuwanie to gain credibility that his rivals are terrorists and to deter potential supporters of his removal. Keller realizes that Silvia returning home means going to the UN, and rushes to the safe room, just in time to prevent her from murdering Zuwanie. Zuwanie is indicted, and Silvia reconciles with Keller before leaving for Matobo.

Cast
 Nicole Kidman as Silvia Broome, an interpreter for the United Nations
 Sean Penn as Tobin Keller, a Secret Service agent assigned to protect dignitaries
 Catherine Keener as Dot Woods, Tobin's partner in the Secret Service
 Jesper Christensen as Nils Lud, the head of security for the Matoban's UN representative
 Yvan Attal as Philippe Broullet, a photographer and family friend to the Broomes
 Earl Cameron as Edmond Zuwanie, the President of the Republic of Matobo
 Curtiss Cook as Ajene Xola, leader of The African Freedom Party
 George Harris as Kuman-Kuman, an exiled Matoban minister
 Michael Wright as Marcus, the dignitary to the Matoban ambassador
 Tsai Chin as Luan, an interpreter to the UN
 Clyde Kusatsu as Lee Wu, a UN security chief
 Eric Keenleyside as Rory Robb, the Security Deputy Chief for UN security
 Hugo Speer as Simon Broome, Silvia's brother
 Maz Jobrani as Secret Service Agent Mo
 Yusuf Gatewood as Secret Service Agent Doug
 Robert Clohessy as FBI Agent King
 Terry Serpico as FBI Agent Lewis
 David Zayas as Secret Service Agent Charlie Russell
 Sydney Pollack as Secret Service Director Jay Pettigrew
 Adrian Martinez as Roland, a UN interpreter

Production
The Interpreter was shot almost entirely in New York City. The opening sequence was shot in Mozambique with a support crew made up largely of South African nationals. The name Matobo is that of a national park, Matobo National Park (Matopos) in Matabeleland Zimbabwe.

Filming in UN buildings
Parts of The Interpreter were filmed inside the UN General Assembly and Security Council chambers. It was the first film to shoot at the location after the UN gave formal permission to the movie's producers in March 2004.

The producers earlier approached the UN about filming there before, but their initial request was turned down. The production would have relocated to Toronto with a constructed set; however, this would have substantially increased costs, and so Sydney Pollack approached then-Secretary-General Kofi Annan directly, and personally negotiated permission to film inside the United Nations. Annan commented on The Interpreter that "the intention was really to do something dignified, something that is honest and reflects the work that this Organization does. And it is with that spirit that the producers and the directors approached their work, and I hope you will all agree they have done that."

The first scenes at UN Headquarters were shot in early March 2004. Filming took place on weekends, public holidays or nights so as not to disturb the regular work of the UN, and the set was closed to tourists and UN staff.

Ambassadors at the UN had hoped to appear in the film, but actors were asked to play the roles of diplomats. Spain's UN Ambassador Inocencio Arias jokingly complained that his "opportunity to have a nomination for the Oscar next year went away because of some stupid regulation."

Matobo and Ku
The country "Republic of Matobo" and its corresponding constructed language "Ku" were created for this film. The director of the Centre for African Language Learning in Covent Garden, London, England, Said el-Gheithy, was commissioned in January 2004 to create Ku. It is based on Bantu languages spoken in Eastern and Southern Africa, and is a cross between Swahili and Shona, with some unique elements.

In Ku, the film's tagline "The truth requires no translation" is "Angota ho ne njumata".

Matobo and Zimbabwe
The fictional African state of Matobo shares its name with the Matobo National Park in Matabeleland, Zimbabwe. Parallels have been drawn between the movie and the real country of Zimbabwe (which is itself mentioned in the film as an existing country), and between the character of Zuwanie and former Zimbabwean President Robert Mugabe.

 Both Mugabe and Zuwanie were once respected freedom-fighters who later became synonymous with corruption and violence.
 In real life, Robert Mugabe had ruled Zimbabwe for 25 years when the movie was released. The movie's Zuwanie had been in power for 23 years.
 At the time of the film's release, Australia and New Zealand were pushing for Mugabe to be indicted by the UN Security Council for trial before the  International Criminal Court on charges of crimes against humanity; Zuwanie is indicted by the UN Security Council for trial before the International  Criminal Court on charges of crimes against humanity.
 Both Mugabe and Zuwanie were teachers before being involved with politics.
 Mugabe tended to wave his fist; Zuwanie his gun.
 Mugabe's government hired Ari Ben-Menashe, a security consultant and lawyer who claimed to be an ex-Israeli secret service agent, as an advisor and used him to allegedly help frame opposition leader Morgan Tsvangirai for treason and for plotting an assassination against Mugabe. Zuwanie is portrayed as arranging for a former Dutch mercenary to arrange an assassination attempt on him to justify using violence against opposition groups.
 Mugabe had a preoccupation with the British and accuses Tony Blair of trying to unseat him. Zuwanie thinks the French are doing the same.
 After coming to power, Mugabe was known to have carried out the Gukurahundi, a series of massacres and pogroms against political rivals and civilians from other tribes. Zuwanie also uses his security forces to ethnically cleanse civilians and murder political opponents prompting the UN to investigate his government. 
 Both Matobo and Zimbabwe have a significant white African community of British and European ancestry who once made up the ruling political class of both countries.
 The flag of Matobo bears a strong resemblance to the flag of Zimbabwe.
 The film has a scene where there is a demonstration against Zuwanie at the UN; one of the anti-Zuwanie demonstrators is a holding a poster with the open-handed symbol which resembles the logo of the main opposition party in Zimbabwe: the Movement for Democratic Change.

Reception

Box office
The Interpreter grossed $72.7 million in the United States and Canada, and $90.2 million in other territories, for a worldwide gross to $162.9 million, against a production budget of $80 million.

The film debuted to $22.8 million, coming in at the high end of industry expectations, and finishing first at the box office. In its second weekend it dropped 39% to $13.8 million, finishing in second place behind The Hitchhiker's Guide to the Galaxy.

Critical response 
On Rotten Tomatoes, the film holds an approval rating of 57% based on 195 reviews, with an average rating of 6/10. The website's critics consensus reads: "A polished and intelligent thriller, though marred by plot implausibilities." Metacritic gave the film a weighted average score of 62 out of 100, based on 41 critics, indicating "generally favorable reviews". Audiences polled by CinemaScore gave the film an average grade of "B" on an A+ to F scale.

Kirk Honeycutt of The Hollywood Reporter wrote: "Thrillers don't get much smarter than The Interpreter."
Todd McCarthy of Variety described it as "Coolly absorbing without being pulse-quickening."

Awards
In 2005, the Los Angeles Film Critics Association awarded Catherine Keener as Best Supporting Actress for her performances in several films, including The Interpreter.

Controversy in Zimbabwe

Upon The Interpreter'''s release in Zimbabwe, that country's Minister of Information and Publicity, Chen Chimutengwende, accused the film of promoting anti-government propaganda. Chimutengwende claimed that Matobo and the fictional Edmond Zuwanie were thinly veiled caricatures of Zimbabwe and then-President Robert Mugabe, and insisted it was part of an international smear campaign being launched against the Mugabe regime by the United States. Tafataona Mahoso, chairman of the Zimbabwean state's Media and Information Commission, also attacked The Interpreter'', claiming it was "typical of US Cold War propaganda". Nevertheless, the Zimbabwe Media Censorship Board found nothing objectionable in the film and approved it for theatrical and video release.

See also
 Ku (language)
 United Nations
 United Nations General Assembly
 United Nations Interpreters
 Matobo National Park

References

External links
 
 
 
 
 
 Dialogue transcript of The Interpreter

2000s political thriller films
2005 films
American political thriller films
British political thriller films
German political thriller films
Foreign relations of Zimbabwe
Censorship in Zimbabwe
Films set in Africa
French films set in New York City
Films set in a fictional country
2000s English-language films
Fictional-language films
Working Title Films films
StudioCanal films
Films directed by Sydney Pollack
Films about interpreting and translation
Films about the United Nations
Films shot in New York City
Films shot in New Jersey
Films with screenplays by Scott Frank
Films with screenplays by Steven Zaillian
Films scored by James Newton Howard
Films produced by Eric Fellner
Films produced by Tim Bevan
Films about diplomacy
2000s American films
British films set in New York City
2000s British films
2000s German films